Persatuan Sepakbola Indonesia Jeneponto (simply known as Persijo) is an Indonesian football club based in Jeneponto Regency, South Sulawesi. They currently compete in the Liga 3.

Honours
 Habibie Cup XV Parepare
 Champion: 2005

References

External links

Sport in South Sulawesi
Football clubs in Indonesia
Football clubs in South Sulawesi